Samuel J. Messick III (April 3, 1931 – October 6, 1998) was an American psychologist who worked for the Educational Testing Service (ETS), known for his contributions to validity theory.

Early life
Messick was born on April 3, 1931 in Philadelphia. He graduated from the University of Pennsylvania, where he earned a bachelor's degree, and he earned a PhD from Princeton University.

Career
Messick worked as a psychologist for the Educational Testing Service (ETS). He examined construct validity. Messick influenced language testing in 2 main ways: in proposing a new understanding of how inferences made based on tests must be challenged, and in drawing attention to the consequences of test use.

Death and legacy
Messick resided in Pennington, New Jersey. He died on October 6, 1998 in Philadelphia, at 67.

The Quantitative and Qualitative Methods division (Division 5) of the American Psychological Association created the Samuel J. Messick Distinguished Scientific Contributions Award to honor Messick's contributions. Douglas N. Jackson, a previous collaborator of Messick, earned the award in 2004.

Works
 (ed. with Harold Gulliksen) Psychological scaling: theory and applications; report of a conference. New York: Wiley, 1960.
 (ed. with John Ross) Measurement in personality and cognition. New York: Wiley, 1962.
 (ed. with Silvan Tomkins) Computer simulation of personality: frontier of psychological theory, New York: Wiley, 1963.
 (ed. with Arthur H. Brayfield) Decision and choice; contributions of Sidney Siegel. New York: McGraw-Hill, 1964.
 (ed. with Douglas N. Jackson) Problems in human assessment. New York: McGraw-Hill, 1967.
 (ed.) Individuality in learning. San Francisco: Jossey-Bass Publishers, 1976.
(ed.) Validity. In R. L. Linn (Ed.) Educational Measurement (3rd ed., pp. 13–103). New York: Macmillan, 1989.

Further reading
McNamara, Tim. "Validity in language testing: The challenge of Sam Messick's legacy". Language Assessment Quarterly: An International Journal. 2006, Vol. 3, No. 1, Pages 31–51
Weideman, Albert. 2012. "Validation and validity beyond Messick". Per Linguam, Vol. 3, No. 2, Pages 1–14

References

1931 births
1998 deaths
People from Philadelphia
People from Pennington, New Jersey
University of Pennsylvania alumni
Princeton University alumni
20th-century American psychologists